Psychogena duplex is a moth in the family Cossidae. It is found in French Guiana.

References

Natural History Museum Lepidoptera generic names catalog

Hypoptinae